Joseph Clement Piché (December 22, 1895 – June 12, 1982) was a Canadian professional ice hockey player. He played one shift in a game for the Montreal Canadiens during the 1921–22 season, on December 21, 1921 in a victory against the Hamilton Tigers. He wore #13.

Previously, Piché played on the Hawkesbury team in the LOHA in the 1914–15 season, and from 1919–21. He signed with the Canadiens on December 6, 1921. After his lone NHL game, he also played on the Quebec Voltigeurs and the Montreal Mount Royal in the Province of Quebec League.

See also
List of players who played only one game in the NHL

References

1895 births
1982 deaths
Ice hockey people from Ontario
Montreal Canadiens players
People from Hawkesbury, Ontario
Canadian ice hockey forwards